A cnidariologist is a zoologist specializing in Cnidaria.

Examples
 Browne, Edward Thomas (1866-1937) 
 Bigelow, Henry Bryant (1879-1967)
 Kirkpatrick, Randolph (1863–1950)
 Kishinouye, Kamakichi (1867-1929)
 Kramp, Paul Lassenius (1887-1975)
 Mayer, Alfred G. (1868-1922)

References

External links

 

Cnidarians
Marine biology
Subfields of zoology